Philip Birnbaum (March 30, 1904 – March 19, 1988) was an American religious author and translator. He is best known for his work Ha-Siddur ha-Shalem, a translation and annotation of the Siddur first published in 1949.

Biography

Birnbaum was born in Kielce, Poland and emigrated to the United States in 1923. He attended Howard College and received his Ph.D. from Dropsie College. He served for several years as the principal of a Jewish day school in Wilmington, Delaware, and directed Jewish schools in Birmingham, Alabama, and Camden, New Jersey. He was a regular columnist and book reviewer for the Hebrew-language weekly Ha-Doar. He also served on the board of directors of the Histadrut Ivrit b'America, an American association for the promotion of Hebrew language and culture.

His works include translations (with annotation and introductory material) of the Siddur (first published in 1949), the Machzor, the Torah with Haftorot, and the Passover Haggadah (published by the Hebrew Publishing Company). These translations sought to express reverence without appearing archaic. His Siddur and Machzor were pioneering in that the Hebrew text is of uniform typeface, "unlike the helter-skelter boldface paragraphing … found in Old World siddurim". His Siddur also contains the rarely published Megillat Antiochus.

Until the recent advent of the Artscroll and Koren translations, the Birnbaum Siddur and Machzor were widely used in Orthodox and Conservative synagogues, selling over 300,000 copies. These works presented "an accessible American English translation" and were pioneering in addressing American Jews' "perceived deficiencies in personal and communal prayer".

Birnbaum is also well known for his works of popular Judaism: his excerpted translation of Maimonides Mishne Torah, was one of the first into English; his "Encyclopedia of Jewish Concepts" and "A Treasury of Judaism" (an Anthology excerpting over 70 classic works) were widely referenced. He also produced a "readable" summary and translation of the Tanakh.

Legacy
On his death, one writer described him as "the most obscure best-selling author".

The Jewish Agency's Culture department describes "the Birnbaum" as "one of the most useful versions of the prayerbook."

Birnbaum's original gravestone misspelled his name, had the wrong birth year, and called him a "renouned author & scholar". In 2022, the original gravestone was replaced with one with all three mistakes corrected and a Hebrew verse from the High Holiday liturgy added.

Publications

References

External links 

 Yosef Lindell, Why a High Holidays prayer book is still going strong after 70 years

1904 births
1988 deaths
20th-century American educators
20th-century American translators
American Orthodox Jews
Dropsie College alumni
Hebrew-language writers
Jewish American writers
Jewish educators
Polish emigrants to the United States
20th-century Polish Jews
Samford University alumni
Translators from Hebrew
Translators to English
20th-century American Jews